HMCyS Parakrama, was a turbine-powered  of the Royal Ceylon Navy, originally built as HMS Pickle (J293) for the Royal Navy during World War II, and transferred to Ceylon by the United Kingdom in 1958. She was scrapped in 1964.

Design and description
The ships' complement consisted of 85 officers and ratings.

The ships had two Parsons geared steam turbines,, each driving one shaft, using steam provided by two Admiralty three-drum boilers.

The Algerine class was armed with a QF  Mk V anti-aircraft gun and four twin-gun mounts for Oerlikon 20 mm cannon. The latter guns were in short supply when the first ships were being completed and they often got a proportion of single mounts. By 1944, single-barrel Bofors 40 mm mounts began replacing the twin 20 mm mounts on a one for one basis. All of the ships were fitted for four throwers and two rails for depth charges.

Royal Navy service
During construction Pickle was adopted by the civil community of Lunedale in Lancashire during Warship Week in 1942. On commissioning she was based at Tobermory.

In January 1944 she joined the 7th Minesweeping Flotilla and was allocated for minesweeping duties as part of Operation Neptune, the naval component of the Normandy Landings in June 1944.

In 1945 she travelled to the Far East to undertake minesweeping duties to support landings at Rangoon. She returned to the UK in September 1945 for paying off. She did attend the Coronation Review at Spithead in 1953. She was placed in reserve and remained there until earmarked for disposal in 1957.

Ceylon Navy service
In 1958 she was transferred to Ceylon with a formal transfer taking place in Devonport on 6 April 1959.

She remained in service until 1964, after which she was scrapped.

References

Bibliography

External links
HMS Pickle at uboat.net
 HMS Pickle at naval.history.net 
HMS Pickle at battleships-cruisers.co.uk 
Sri Lanka Navy

 

Algerine-class minesweepers of the Royal Navy
Ships built in Belfast
1943 ships
World War II minesweepers of the United Kingdom
Algerine-class minesweepers of the Royal Ceylon Navy